Gordafarid, Former name Fatemeh Habibizad (born 27 January 1977 in Ahwaz, Iran), is a Naqqal (storyteller) of the Shahname and is considered to be the first female Naqqal of Iran. She is one of the first Iranian women to perform Persian folk theatre in Europe. She is known as the most famous student of Morshed Torabi. In February 2010, she immigrated to the United States and now teaches Persian at UCLA.

Sources
 Gordafarid in the UNESCO's Representative List of the Intangible Cultural Heritage of Humanity 
 Persian Wikipedia page of Fatemeh Habibizad on 17 January 2022 
 Biography of Gordafarid with English 
 JadidOnline 20, 07, 2007

References 

People from Ahvaz
Shahnameh Researchers
Researchers of Persian literature
Iranian women artists
Academic staff of the University of Tehran
1977 births
Living people